Thomas Roy Dent (April 22, 1891 – July 18, 1977) was a farmer and politician in Ontario, Canada. He represented Oxford in the Legislative Assembly of Ontario from 1943 to 1955 as a Conservative.

The son of Thomas Harrison Dent and Elizabeth Paddon, he was born in Woodstock and was educated there and at the Ontario Agricultural College. In 1920, Dent married Susan M. Griffin. He was a judge and breeder of Holstein Friesian cattle and was president of the Holstein Friesian Association.

Dent ran unsuccessfully for a seat in the Ontario assembly in 1937 before being elected in 1943. He died in Woodstock at the age of 86.

References

External links
 

1891 births
1977 deaths
People from Woodstock, Ontario
Progressive Conservative Party of Ontario MPPs